An upset occurs in a competition, frequently in electoral politics or sports, when the party popularly expected to win (the "favorite"), either loses to or draws/ties a game with an underdog whom the majority expects to lose, defying the conventional wisdom. If it happens in a cup competition, it is sometimes referred to as a "cupset" (a portmanteau, combining the words "cup" and "upset"). It is often used in reference to beating the betting odds in sports, or beating the opinion polls in electoral politics.

Origin
The meaning of the word "upset" has long included "an overthrowing or overturn of ideas, plans, etc." (see OED definition 6b), from which the sports definition almost surely derived. "Upset" also once referred to "a curved part of a bridle-bit, fitting over the tongue of the horse", (now the port of a curb bit) but, even though the modern sports meaning of "upset" was first used far more for horse races than for any other competition, there is no evidence of a connection

In 2002, George Thompson, a lexicographic researcher, used the full-text online search capabilities of The New York Times databases to trace the usage of the verb to upset  and the noun upset. The latter was seen in usage as early as 1877. 

Thompson's research debunked one popular theory of the term's origin, namely that it was first used after the surprising defeat of the  horse Man o' War by the racehorse Upset in 1919 (the loss was the only one in Man o' War's career) .
The term pre-dates that 1919 Thoroughbred race by at least several decades. In its sports coverage immediately following Upset's victory, the Washington Post wrote, "One might make all sorts of puns about it being an upset."
The name of the horse "Upset" came from the "trouble" or "distress" meaning of the word (as shown by the parallelism of the name of Upset's stablemate, Regret).

Sports 
Below is a selection of major upsets from a variety of popular sports around the world. It is not meant to be comprehensive, merely representative.

American football

Heading into the 2007 college football season, the Michigan Wolverines were ranked as the pre-season Number 5 team, and among the favorites for that year's BCS National Championship. As an early season tune-up game, Michigan had booked the lower division Appalachian State Mountaineers for their first game of the season. The Mountaineers surprised the football world by leading 28–17 at the half. Though Michigan clawed their way back to lead 32–31 late into the fourth quarter, the Mountaineers kicked a field goal with 26 seconds left in the game to take the lead 34–32. Michigan managed to use only 20 seconds of game time to drive the ball down to the App State 27-yard line, and as time was expiring the Mountaineers Corey Lynch blocked a Michigan field goal attempt to secure the upset for App State. The game marked only the second time, to that point, that a lower-division school had beaten a top-division AP-ranked team.

In Super Bowl III, the senior National Football League was playing their third interleague championship game against the upstart American Football League. The NFL had won the prior two matchups without much difficulty, and it looked poised to do so again, as the Baltimore Colts, with a 13–1 record, behind quarterback Earl Morrall, who led the league in touchdown passes that season and was named NFL Most Valuable Player. The team also had several future Hall of Fame players on the roster, including quarterback Johnny Unitas, relegated to a back-up role following an early-season injury, tight end John Mackey, as well as a defense led by perennial all-pro Bubba Smith. The New York Jets were led by Joe Namath at quarterback, who earlier in the week had "guaranteed" victory against the Colts. Namath's top target, future Hall of Fame wide receiver Don Maynard, was hobbled by an injury, but Namath led the Jets on a run-focused attack that leaned heavily on fullback Matt Snell, who ran for 121 yards and scored the Jets' only touchdown. The Jets defense confounded Morrall, who had only six completions on 17 attempts, with three interceptions in the first half, including an interception to the Jets' Jim Hudson while Colts' star receiver Jimmy Orr, uncovered in the end zone, waved his hands to no avail. Colts' head coach Don Shula put the hobbled Unitas in the game in the second half, and despite a late game touchdown, lost the game 16–7.

Association football
Examples of a "giant-killing" non-league team (Levels 5 to 10) beating a Level 1 opponent in the English FA Cup are National League side Lincoln City's away victory over Premier League side Burnley in the 2016–17 FA Cup and Conference Premier side Luton Town's away victory over the Premier League's Norwich City in the 2012–13 Fourth Round Proper. This was the first defeat of a top flight team by non-league opposition since 1989, when Sutton United claimed a 2–1 victory at home over Coventry City, who had won the FA Cup two seasons earlier and finished that season seventh in the First Division.

A major upset in Spanish football was the Alcorconazo, when in the first leg of a 2009–10 Copa del Rey AD Alcorcón won over Real Madrid 4–0. Real Madrid is one of the largest clubs in Spanish football and the world while Alcorcón team played in the third-tier Segunda División B. Because Real Madrid won the second leg only 1–0, Alcorcón advanced victorious to the next round. The half-time substitution of Guti when the score was 3–0 and when he was booked before was another topic in the Spanish press because of words exchanged between the player and his coach, Manuel Pellegrini.

Baseball
The 1906 World Series looked to be one of the most lopsided matchups in World Series history, as the National League powerhouse Chicago Cubs, with a record of 116–36 represented the best winning percentage in modern Major League Baseball history. They faced off against their cross-town rivals, the Chicago White Sox, who finished with the American League pennant having a record of 93–58. The White Sox were dubbed the "hitless wonders" as their .230 team batting average was not only the worst batting average by a team to win their league pennant, it was the worst overall batting average in all of Major League Baseball that season. Buoyed by a pitching staff that held the Cubs to below 0.200 batting average for the series, the White Sox showed an uncharacteristic surge of batting prowess in games 5 and 6 with 16 runs on 26 hits over the two games to claim the World Series crown four games to two in what has been called the biggest upset in MLB history.

Basketball
In the 1985 NCAA Division I men's basketball tournament, the Georgetown Hoyas had won the previous national championship, and looked poised to win their second straight, as they entered the 1985 national championship as the defending national champion with the Number 1 overall seed, as well as the Number 1 seed in the East Region, posting a record of 35–2, including a Big East tournament title. Their opponent and Big East rival, the Number 8 seed Villanova Wildcats, entered the national championship with a 24–10 record. Villanova defeated Georgetown, 66–64, in what has been considered one of the biggest upsets in NCAA Division I men's basketball tournament history. As of 2022, this is the only time an 8th-seeded team has won the NCAA tournament and the 1984–85 Villanova team remains the lowest-seeded team to win the NCAA tournament.

The Stanford Cardinal entered the 1998 NCAA Division I women's basketball tournament with the Number 1 seed in the West Region, posting a record of 21–5, including a Pac-10 regular season title. Their opponent, the Number 16 seed Harvard Crimson, entered the tournament with a 22–4 record and an Ivy League regular season title. Before this match, no Number 1 seed had ever fallen to a Number 16 seed since the field expanded to 64 teams in 1994. Harvard defeated Stanford, 71–67, in what has been considered the biggest upset in NCAA Division I women's basketball tournament history. 20 years later, a Number 16 seed had beaten a Number 1 seed in men's tournament (see below).

The Virginia Cavaliers entered the 2018 NCAA Division I men's basketball tournament with the Number 1 overall seed, as well as the Number 1 seed in the South Region, posting a record of 31–2, including both an ACC regular season title and ACC tournament title. Their opponent, Number 16 seed UMBC, entered the tournament with a 24–10 record and an America East tournament title. Before this match, no Number 1 seed had ever fallen to a Number 16 seed since the field expanded to 64 teams in 1985. UMBC defeated Virginia, 74–54, in what has been considered the biggest upset in NCAA Tournament history. This is the only time a Number 16 seed has beaten a Number 1 seed in NCAA Division I men's basketball tournament until 2023 (see below).

The Purdue Boilermakers entered the 2023 NCAA Division I men's basketball tournament with the Number 1 seed in the East Region, posting a record of 29–5, including both a Big Ten regular season and tournament title. Their opponent, Number 16 seed Fairleigh Dickinson Knights, entered the tournament with a 20–15 record after an 84–61 win over Texas Southern in the First Four. Despite a 67–66 loss in the Northeast Conference tournament championship game to the NEC regular season champion Merrimack Warriors, Fairleigh Dickinson recieves an automatic bid to the NCAA tournament as the NEC tournament runners-up, while the NEC tournament champion Merrimack was ineligible for the NCAA tournament due to a 4-year transition from Division II. Closed as 23.5-point underdogs, Fairleigh Dickinson shocked Purdue 63–58 to become the second Number 16 seed to beat a Number 1 seed in NCAA Division I men's basketball tournament history.

Entering the first round of the 2007 NBA Playoffs, the Dallas Mavericks had the best record in all of NBA at 67–15, six games up on second place, while their first round opponent, the Golden State Warriors, had a 42–40 record and had only qualified for the tournament on the last day of the regular season, having needed to win all of their last five games just to qualify. Dallas was captained by power forward Dirk Nowitzki, who was in the midst of a Hall-of-Fame career that would feature 14 all star appearances, and supported by other star players such as Jason Terry, Jerry Stackhouse, Devin Harris, and Josh Howard. Golden State had completely revamped their team mid-season, including two starters (Stephen Jackson and Al Harrington), who arrived in January in a blockbuster 8-player deal with the Indiana Pacers. Baron Davis was the unquestioned star of the playoff run, as he dominated the Mavericks, averaging 25.3 points, 6.5 assists, and 2.9 steals per game, as the Warriors would knock off the Mavericks four games to two.

Cricket

In the 1983 Cricket World Cup, the third edition of the tournament, the West Indies cricket team had won both of the previous two World Cups and looked poised to win their third. Their opponent in the finals, India, had never made it out of the group stage before 1983. India went to bat first, and managed 183 before being dismissed with five overs left. West Indies star batsman, Viv Richards, hit a hook towards the leg-side boundary, where Indian captain Kapil Dev made a running catch to get out the West Indies best batsman. Among the remaining batsman, only Jeff Dujon managed more than 20 runs, and West Indies were bowled out at 140, giving India their first World Cup.

Ice hockey
Entering the first round of the 2019 Stanley Cup playoffs, the Tampa Bay Lightning earned the Presidents' Trophy as the NHL's best regular season team with a 62–16–4 record (128 points), while their first round opponent, the Columbus Blue Jackets, had a 47–31–4 record (98 points), had qualified for the playoffs for the third straight year and earned the second wild card spot in the Eastern Conference. The Blue Jackets swept the Lightning in four games and won the playoff series for the first time in franchise history, in what has been considered the biggest upset in Stanley Cup playoffs history. This marks the first time in Stanley Cup playoffs history that the Presidents' Trophy winners were swept in the opening round.

Politics 
Below is a list of national elections which have extensively been described as upsets by a number of major media sources. It is not meant to be comprehensive, merely representative.

Australia 

2019 House of Representatives election: the ruling Liberal-National Coalition won an absolute majority of 77 out of the 151 seats in the House of Representatives, despite trailing the opposition Labor Party in opinion polls for almost three years.

France 

2002 presidential election: far-right candidate Jean-Marie Le Pen, of the National Front, finished as the runner-up over prime minister Lionel Jospin and thus progressed to a run-off against incumbent president Jacques Chirac. Chirac would ultimately defeat Le Pen in a historic landslide.

The Gambia 

2016 presidential election: dictatorial president Yahya Jammeh, in power since 1994, unexpectedly lost the election to opposition candidate Adama Barrow.

Malaysia 

2018 House of Representatives election: the opposition Pakatan Harapan coalition won an absolute majority of 113 seats in the Dewan Rakyat (lower house of parliament), thus ending the 61-year rule of the Barisan Nasional coalition and bringing about the first change of a ruling party in the country's history.

Serbia 

2012 presidential election: Tomislav Nikolić of the Serbian Progressive Party defeated Boris Tadić of the Democratic Party, who had recently resigned as the president of Serbia in order to trigger an early election. Nikolić had previously lost to Tadić in two elections.

Sri Lanka  

2015 presidential election: two-term strongman president Mahinda Rajapaksa, of the United People's Freedom Alliance, lost his bid for a third term to opposition candidate Maithripala Sirisena.

United Kingdom 

1945 United Kingdom general election: The universal expectation that successful wartime leader Winston Churchill would win the first poll after the defeat of Germany in World War II, was shattered by the overwhelming landslide victory of the Labour Party, raising Clement Attlee to the post of Prime Minister.
1992 United Kingdom general election: the ruling Conservative Party won a fourth consecutive absolute majority in the House of Commons, despite opinion polls having predicted a hung parliament or a narrow absolute majority for the opposition Labour Party.
2015 United Kingdom general election: the Conservative Party, for the previous five years part of a coalition government with the Liberal Democrats, went on to win a majority in the House of Commons despite most polls predicting a hung parliament. 
2017 United Kingdom general election: the ruling Conservative Party lost its absolute majority in the House of Commons, despite opinion polls predicting that they would keep it or even increase it.

United States 

1948 presidential election: Harry Truman was reelected as the president of the United States over New York governor Thomas E. Dewey, who had been leading in opinion polls.
2010 United States Senate special election in Massachusetts: As a result of incumbent senator Ted Kennedy's death on August 25, 2009, Massachusetts elected Republican Scott Brown.
2016 presidential election: Donald Trump was elected as the president of the United States over Hillary Clinton, despite many media sources showing her leading in both national and statewide opinion polls, and Trump ultimately losing the popular vote to her.
2022 United States House special election in Alaska: As a result of 49-year incumbent Don Young's death on March 18, 2022, Alaska elected Democrat Mary Peltola over Republican Sarah Palin, who had been the Republican vice presidential nominee in 2008.

See also
 Cinderella (sports)
 Dark horse

References

Competition
Terminology used in multiple sports